Jeffrey Miller may refer to:

Jeffrey Miller (shooting victim) (1950–1970), American student at Kent State University, shot and killed by Ohio National Guardsmen
Jeffrey B. Miller, former commissioner of the Pennsylvania State Police
J. C. P. Miller   (1906–1981), English mathematician and computing pioneer
Jeffrey J. Miller (born 1961), American author and historian
Jeffrey T. Miller (born 1943), United States federal judge
Jeffery Miller (born 1996), American jazz musician
Surya Das (born 1950), American Buddhist lama, born in 1950 as Jeffrey Miller
Jeffrey Alan Miller, American literary scholar
Jeffrey Miller, leader of the New Union Party

See also
Jeff Miller (disambiguation)
Geoffrey Miller (disambiguation)